The Monitor of All-sky X-ray Image (MAXI) is an X-ray telescope mounted on the International Space Station since 2009. The instrument uses wide field of view X-ray detectors to perform a sky survey, measuring the brightness of X-ray sources every 96 minutes (one ISS orbit).

Instrument
MAXI was developed by the Japan Aerospace Exploration Agency (JAXA). It was launched in 2009 and mounted on the outside of the Kibō module.

The instrument uses several wide field of view X-ray detectors, including the Gas Slit Camera (GSC) and the Solid-state Slit Camera (SSC), to monitor astronomical X-ray sources for variability. MAXI conducts a full sky survey every 96 minutes (one ISS orbit).

In August 2022 a fast X-ray follow-up observation program was started with the NICER instrument named "OHMAN (On-orbit Hookup of MAXI and NICER)" to detect sudden bursts in X-ray phenomena.

Discoveries
MAXI has been in operation for several years and has made several x-ray photos of nebulae and space objects.

MAXI helped discover the rapidly rotating black-hole/star system MAXI J1659-152.

Successor

iSEEP Wide-Field MAXI (iWF-MAXI) is a follow-on instrument to the current MAXI. Compared with MAXI, which can only monitor 2% of the celestial sphere instantaneously, iWF-MAXI is always capable of monitoring 10%, and can monitor up to 80% in 92 minutes. iWF-MAXI will utilize the i-SEEP (IVA-replaceable Small Exposed Experiment Platform) bus, an exposure adapter for middle-sized payloads in JEM-EF. Chosen as an ISAS Mission of Opportunity in 2015, iWF-MAXI is currently targeted to begin observation at the ISS by 2019.

See also
Scientific research on the ISS

References

External links
 MAXI, Japan Aerospace Exploration Agency
 Monitor of All-sky X-ray Image Fact Sheet, NASA.gov
 MAXI Monitor of All-sky X-ray Image researcher page, Riken
 Images

International Space Station experiments
Space imagers
X-ray astronomy